The Fourth Light, released in March 2015, is the fourth full-length studio album by Niyaz, and their first since the departure of former bandmember Carmen Rizzo.

Track listing 
 "Sabza Ba Naz" (The Triumph of love)
 "Tam e Eshq" (The Taste of love)
 "Eyvallah Shahim" (Truth) 
 "Yek Nazar" (A Single Glance)
 "Man Haramam" (I am a sin)
 "Aurat" (Woman)
 "Khuda Bowad Yaret" (Divine Companion)
 "Shir Ali Mardan" (Song of a Warrior)
 "Marg e Man" (My Elegy)

References

Niyaz albums
2015 albums